In the Red Records is an independent record label in Los Angeles, California, formed in 1991 by Larry Hardy. It is known for hosting garage rock related bands.

The label's first release was by The Morlocks, and its second release was Kings of Rock. Hardy has publicly stated that he wished he would have waited for Mick Collins' The Gories material to be finished for the first release. However the Gories recording was slow going and Larry became impatient, rushing the two initial releases into production.

Bands that have released LPs on this label include Cheap Time, Cheater Slicks, Thee Oh Sees, Reigning Sound, Dan Melchior's Broke Revue, The Ponys, The Intelligence, The Hunches, The Dirtbombs, The Deadly Snakes, Sparks, Andre Williams, Black Lips, LAMPS, Pussy Galore, Boss Hog, Jon Spencer Blues Explosion, Jay Reatard, The Horrors, Bassholes, The Fuse, Country Teasers, The King Khan & BBQ Show, Panther Burns, Demon's Claws, Mark Sultan, Vivian Girls, Monkey Wrench, Human Eye, Shark Toys, Strange Boys, Blank Dogs, Dávila 666, Speedball Baby, Sonic Chicken 4, Wounded Lion Meatbodies, and Fuzz.

Current artists 

Action Swingers
A.H. Kraken
Alice Bag
Arndales
Bassholes
Blacktop
Blank Dogs
Boss Hog
CCR Headcleaner
CFM
Cheap Time
Cheater Slicks
Christmas Island
Clone Defects
Consumers
Thee Cormans
Country Teasers
Dan Melchior's Broke Revue
Danny & the Darleans
Davilla 666
The Deadly Snakes
Demolition Doll Rods
Demon's Claws
The Dirtbombs
The Double
Eastlink
Ex-Cult
Feedtime
The Fresh & Onlys
The Fuse!
Fuzz
G0ggs
Haunted George
The Horrors
The Hospitals
Human Eye
The Hunches
The Intelligence
The Intended
Jay Reatard
Jon Spencer Blues Explosion
Kid Congo
Kim Salmon & the Surrealists
King Brothers
King Khan & BBQ Show
Knoxville Girls
Lamps
Lili Z
Lord High Fixers
Lost Sounds
Meatbodies
Milk Lines
Miss Alex White
Mystery Girls
Necessary Evils
Now Time Delegation 
Pampers
Parting Gifts
The Piranhas
Ponys
Power
Pussy Galore
Red Aunts
Reigning Sound
The Screws
Shark Toys
The Side Eyes
Sleeping Beauties
Sparks
Speedball Baby
The Spits
Strange Boys
Submarine Races
Mark Sultan
Thee Oh Sees
Timmy's Organism
The Traditional Fools
TV Ghost
Ty Segall Band
Tyvek
Vivian Girls
Volt
Wand
Watery Love
Andre Williams
Wolfmanhattan Project
Wounded Lion
Zig Zags

See also 
 List of record labels

References

External links 
 Official site

American independent record labels
Garage rock record labels